Maisie Hannah Peters (born 28 May 2000) is an English singer-songwriter. She is best known for her debut studio album You Signed Up for This which was released under Ed Sheeran's Gingerbread Man Records label.

Peters was previously signed to Atlantic Records, with which she released two EPs. She also curated the season two soundtrack to the British comedy series Trying.

Early life
Peters was born on 28 May 2000 in a small town in West Sussex, England to a teacher and communications worker. She has a twin sister, Ellen.

Peters began singing around age eight, performing in choirs. She wrote her first song at age nine and began writing songs regularly at the age of 12, after borrowing her friend's guitar for a school project. At age 15, she began busking on the streets of Brighton and uploading original songs to YouTube.

Career

At age 15 in 2016, Peters began her music career; performing several original songs on The Ayala Show.

In August of 2017, Peters independently released her debut single "Place We Were Made" and later, that December released her second single "Birthday". The songs gained attention in indie-pop circles and "Place We Were Made" was named BBC Introducing's song of the week early 2018. Following this attention, Peters signed with Atlantic Records UK. Under their banner, she released various singles, notably Worst Of You, and two EPs, Dressed Too Nice for a Jacket and It's Your Bed Babe, It's Your Funeral. 

"Feels Like This" (from Dressed Too Nice for a Jacket) and "Favourite Ex" were featured on season five of Love Island UK and later "Brooklyn" (from You Signed Up For This), was featured in the ninth season of Love Island UK.

In 2020, Peters contributed the song "Smile" to the soundtrack album Birds of Prey: The Album, for the film Birds of Prey. She was also announced as the opening act for Niall Horan's Nice to Meet Ya Tour on tourdates in Europe. However, these concerts were cancelled due to the COVID-19 pandemic. Peters released work for another soundtrack in 2021, this time for the Apple TV+ original series Trying. She wrote and performed all songs, with a feature by fellow British recording artist James Bay on the song "Funeral". Around this time, Peters created an online book club via Instagram.

On 15 June 2021, Peters left Atlantic Records and signed with Ed Sheeran's Gingerbread Man Records. Under this label, she released her debut album You Signed Up for This on 27 August 2021. The album debuted at number 2 on the UK Albums Chart and was the top selling album in UK independent record stores for that week. With the first two singles of the record, "John Hughes Movie" and "Psycho", Peters garnered her first notations on the British charts.

Peters embarked on her first headlining tour in 2022, touring the United States. Later that year, she joined Sheeran's +–=÷x Tour as opening act. While touring she released singles "Cate's Brother", "Blonde" and "Not Another Rockstar". Peters later, announced she would tour the United Kingdom in April of 2023.

On 27 January 2023, Peters released the lead single, "Body Better", from her second album, calling it one of her "most honest songs ever". Following this, on 15 February 2023, Peters announced the release of her second album, The Good Witch, alongside its track list, to be released on 16 June 2023, describing it as her own "twisted version of a breakup album".

Artistry and influences
Peters possesses a soprano voice. She is a self described "massive fan of Taylor Swift". She has also expressed admiration for English-Irish girl group Girls Aloud and English artist Lily Allen. She has also cited Arctic Monkeys, My Chemical Romance, All Time Low and Fall Out Boy as influences in her more pop rock songs.

Awards and nominations

Discography

Studio albums

Soundtrack albums

Extended plays

Singles

Songwriting credits

Guest appearances

Filmography

Tours

Headlining act
 Maisie Peters U.S. Tour (2022)
 Road to Brixton Tour (2023)

Opening act
 Mahalia's Tour (UK dates) (2017)
 Tom Walker's Tour (Uk & European dates) (2018)
 Lauv's 'How i'm feeling' world tour (North America) (2019) – Cancelled
 Niall Horan's Nice to Meet Ya Tour (European dates) (2020) – Cancelled 
 Ed Sheeran's +–=÷x Tour (All dates) (2022–2023)

References

External links
 
 
 

2000 births
21st-century English women singers
21st-century English singers
Atlantic Records artists
English women singer-songwriters
Gingerbread Man Records artists
Living people
Musicians from Brighton and Hove
Musicians from Sussex
Music YouTubers
People educated at Steyning Grammar School
People from Steyning